is a series of 19 emulated arcade machine game titles from the 80s and 90s for PlayStation 2 published by Hamster and only available in Japan. Of the 19 games, the last two–Thunder Cross (1988) and Trio the Punch (1990)–were previously never released on home platforms.

Each game costs 2,000¥ and includes seven items:

 A PlayStation 2 CD-ROM disc with the emulated arcade game
 A miniDVD with promotional trailers of other Gēsen Zoku titles and a "Masterplay" video (a playthrough played by an expert)
 A Mini CD with the original game soundtrack and arranged versions (remixes by group Super Sweep)
 Instructions booklet with information about the original Arcade PCB
 Official mini strategy guide book (with game information, tactics and advice)
 Replica display card
 Collection card (reproducing the original arcade flyer)

Released titles

See also 
 Arcade Archives

References 

2005 video games
Arcade video games
Japan-exclusive video games
PlayStation 2 games
Video game compilations
Konami video game compilations
Video games developed in Japan